Jesús Salvador Alfaro Coronado (born 1 January 1968) is a Mexican former footballer who played as a goalkeeper. Currently, he is the goalkeeper coach at Guadalajara. During his career, Alfaro played for Mexican teams UAT, Toluca, UAG and Pachuca.

Alfaro retired in 2005, playing for Correcaminos, the same team of his debut.

Honours

Club
Pachuca
 Mexican First Division: Invierno 1999, Invierno 2001

References

1968 births
Living people
People from Ciudad Victoria
Footballers from Tamaulipas
Mexican footballers
Association football goalkeepers
Deportivo Toluca F.C. players
C.F. Pachuca players
Correcaminos UAT footballers
Tecos F.C. footballers